By Killing is a 1965 Argentine film directed by Román Viñoly Barreto.

Cast
 Jorge Salcedo ... Mauro Moreno
 Nelly Meden ... Rosa
 José María Langlais ... El Sueco
 Graciela Borges ... Georgina
 Walter Vidarte ... Nacho
 Sergio Renán ... Charly
 Gilda Lousek ... Mabel
 Ambar La Fox ... Cantante
 Darío Vittori ... Sacerdote
 Bernardo Perrone ... Dr. Zani
 Mario Lozano ... Pascual
 Norberto Suárez ... Mincho

External links
 

1965 films
1960s Spanish-language films
Argentine black-and-white films
Films directed by Román Viñoly Barreto
1960s Argentine films